An umbrella school is an alternative education school that serves to oversee the homeschooling of children to fulfill government educational requirements.

Umbrella schools vary greatly in what they offer and cost. Some offer group classes, a defined curriculum, sports, field trips, standardized testing, and more. Others exist only to meet the minimum legal requirements, allowing parents to choose their curriculum and methods of teaching, as well as freedom from an annual evaluation or testing requirements. Additionally, some umbrella schools follow a specific faith, while others are secular.

In the United States, the responsibilities of umbrella schools vary from state to state. Many states require schools to collect immunization and attendance records, and similar records as required for any publicly run school. Often, umbrella schools operate under the same legal guidelines as independent schools. Some states have course and daily time requirements. In others, students are bound to the normal standard school year and records must be kept to prove that students fulfill the required amount of time.

Other umbrella terms
 Umbrella term
 Umbrella fund
 Umbrella organization
 Umbrella brand

References

Alternative education